Sheleksa is a rural locality (a settlement) in Savinskoye Urban Settlement of Plesetsky District, Arkhangelsk Oblast, Russia. The population was 90 as of 2010. There are 12 streets.

Geography 
Sheleksa is located 23 km north of Plesetsk (the district's administrative centre) by road. Savinsky is the nearest rural locality.

References 

Rural localities in Plesetsky District